Anampses melanurus, the white-spotted wrasse, 
is a fish found in the Pacific Ocean.

References

White-spotted wrasse
Fish described in 1857
Taxa named by Pieter Bleeker